Victoria Chun (born 1969) is the current director of athletics for Yale University. She previously served as athletic director for Colgate University from 2012 to 2018, as an associate athletic director at Colgate University from 2007 to 2012, and as women's volleyball head coach at Colgate University from 1994 to 1996. Chun attended college at Colgate University, where she played on the Colgate Raiders women's volleyball team. Chun was named athletic director at Yale University on February 1, 2018.

Head coaching record

References

External links
 
Colgate Raiders bio

1969 births
Living people
Colgate Raiders athletic directors
Yale Bulldogs athletic directors
Sportspeople from Santa Monica, California
Colgate Raiders women's volleyball players
Colgate Raiders women's volleyball coaches
Women college athletic directors in the United States